Corpusty and Saxthorpe railway station was a railway station in North Norfolk. It was opened by the Eastern & Midlands Railway as a stop on their route between Melton Constable and Great Yarmouth. It was closed in 1959. It served the villages of Corpusty and Saxthorpe, neither of which has a rail link today.

References

Disused railway stations in Norfolk
Former Midland and Great Northern Joint Railway stations
Railway stations in Great Britain opened in 1883
Railway stations in Great Britain closed in 1959